Arjansukh is a village in Kunkavav Taluka of Amreli district, Gujarat, India. It is about twenty-nine miles east of Junagadh and twenty-one miles west of Amreli.

History
During British period, the village was a separate taluka which was later fell under jurisdiction of Junagadh State in 1806–07. The village had a share of the representative of the firm of Gopalrao Mairal of Baroda State.

Connectivity
The Khakhria railway station on the Bhavnagar-Dhoraji line is only two miles to the north of this village.

References

Cities and towns in Amreli district